Henry Barratt born 28 April 1983 in Oxford, Oxfordshire, England is a rugby union player for the London Wasps in the Guinness Premiership. He plays as a centre.

He appeared as a replacement in the Help for Heroes game.

References

External links
Guinness Premiership profile
Wasps profile
Cornish Pirates profile
Harlequins profile

Living people
1983 births
English rugby union players
Rugby union players from Oxford
Wasps RFC players
Rugby union centres